Lopušné Pažite is a village and municipality in the Kysucké Nové Mesto District in the Žilina Region of northern Slovakia. Lopušné Pažite was created by merging the former villages of Lopušná and Pažite in 1946.

History 
Because Lopušné Pažite was merged from two towns, their origins also begin separately. The first mention of the older village Lopušné was in 1572. At that time, the village belonged to the Budatín estate and had one taxed and two untaxed farmsteads with one jailer and was based on Wallachian law. In 1598, the village grew to 7 houses. In 1720, the village grew to 9 taxpayers and jailers. Lastly in 1828; agriculture, sheep farming, and beekeeping became the primary economic focus of the town, and the village had grown to 24 houses and 236 inhabitants. The village of Pažite on is first mentioned in 1662 as a manor, belonging to the Strepnian estate. In 1784, sheep farming became the primary economic focus of the village, also containing 15 houses, 16 families and 92 inhabitants. The village church belonged to the parish of Horný Vadičov.

Following World War II in 1946, Lopušné Pažite was created by merging the former villages of Lopušná and Pažite.

Geography 
The village is located in the central part of the Kysucká Highlands in the valley of the Vadičov brook. It has forests on the perimeter, the central and eastern areas of the village are mainly deforested. Brown forest soil is the most common soil type. The village also lies at an altitude of 675 metres and covers an area of 4.267 km².

See also 
 List of municipalities and towns in Slovakia

References

External links 
 Archived statistics

1946 establishments
Cities and towns in Slovakia
Populated places established in the 20th century
Villages and municipalities in Kysucké Nové Mesto District